Lambeosaurini, previously known as Corythosaurini, is one of four tribes of hadrosaurid ornithopods from the family Lambeosaurinae. It is defined as all lambeosaurines closer to Lambeosaurus lambei than to Parasaurolophus walkeri, Tsintaosaurus spinorhinus, or Aralosaurus tuberiferus, which define the other three tribes. Members of this tribe possess a distinctive protruding cranial crest. Lambeosaurins walked the earth for a period of around 12 million years in the Late Cretaceous, though they were confined to regions of modern-day North America and Asia.

History of classification 
The term Corythosaurini was first used by Brett-Surman in 1989, who characterized the taxon via reference to the premaxilary expansion into a hollow helmet-like cranial crest, as well as higher neural spines. The clade was formally defined via phylogenetic analysis by Evans and Reisz in 2007, and this was confirmed by multiple other analyses. In 2011, Sullivan et al. observed that by the rules of priority set by the International Code of Zoological Nomenclature, the name of the tribe ought to be Lambeosaurini due to its containing the defining type genus (Lambeosaurus) of its superior taxon (Lambeosaurinae).

Anatomy 
The current articulation of lambeosaurin anatomy is given by Prieto-Marquez et al., who characterised the tribe by the following traits:

 "Vertical groove on lateral process of premaxilla, located rostral to dorsal process of maxilla and extending ventrally from small opening between premaxillary medial and lateral processes"
 "Vertical groove bounded rostrally by triangular ventral projection of lateral process of the premaxilla"
 "Nasal articulation surface for frontal shaped into rostroventrally-sloping platform"
 "Nasal vestibule folded into S-loop in enclosed premaxillary passages rostral to dorsal process of maxilla"
 "Lateral premaxillary process extending caudodorsal to prefrontal in adults"

Lambeosaurines are classified into Lambeosaurini and Parasaurolophini based on the similarity with these characteristics or those defining Parasaurolophini. Another method of distinguishing the tribes is by the angle of the dural peak. Lambeosaurins possess a dural peak with an angle over 120°, while in parasaurolophins the angle is less than 90°. The anterior semicircular canals are also taller in parasaurolophins than lambeosaurins.

Phylogeny 
Prieto-Marquez' analysis (2013) yielded the following cladogram, which shows the relative positions of the four Lambeosaurine tribes.
Nipponosaurus has historically been considered to be a member of Lambeosaurini, but its position within the tribe is debated. A 2018 analysis by Takasaki et al. disputed this placement, instead placing Nipponosaurus in a clade with Arenysaurus and Blasisaurus as a sister taxa to Lambeosaurini.

An alternative phylogenetic analysis by Xing et al. (2017) produced the following cladogram, which similarly places Arenysaurus outside Lambeosaurini.

See also 
 Timeline of hadrosaur research

References 

Lambeosaurines